is a Japanese politician who has been the leader of the Nippon Ishin no Kai since 27 August 2022. He is also a member of the House of Representatives in the Diet (national legislature), currently for the Osaka 17th district. 

Baba was born in Sakai city, Osaka in 1965, and graduated Osaka Prefectural Ōtori High School. In 1993, he was elected to the Sakai City Council for the first time. He served as a member of the Sakai City Council until 2012. He was a member of the Liberal Democratic Party for a long time when he was a city councilor, but left the party in 2010 to join the formation of the Osaka Restoration Association, and has served as vice president of the party since 2011.

In 2012, Baba resigned as a member of the Sakai City Council. In the same year, he ran in the 2012 general election for the House of Representatives in Osaka's 17th district from the Japan Restoration Party and was elected for the first time.

In September 2014, Baba participated in the formation of the Japan Innovation Party through the merger of the Unity Party and the Japan Restoration Party, and was reelected in the 2014 general election for the House of Representatives in Osaka's 17th district. Subsequently, he was newly appointed as the chairman of the Diet Affairs Committee of the Japan Innovation Party.

In August 2015, when the Restoration Party split, Baba announced that he would join the new party led by then Osaka Mayor Hashimoto, and on 8 September, he was removed from his position as chairman of the Japan Innovation Party's Diet Affairs Committee.

On 25 December, Baba officially joined the Initiative from Osaka and became the party's secretary general.

Baba was elected for the third time in the 2017 general election for the House of Representatives; he was elected for the fourth time in the 2021 general election for the House of Representatives.

On 30 November 2021, Baba was appointed co-leader and the leader of parliamentary delegate of Nippon Ishin no Kai.

In July 2022, Ichirō Matsui, then leader of Nippon Ishin no Kai, announced his resignation; on 2 August Baba announced his candidacy for party representative following Matsui's resignation; on 27 August Baba received 8,527 of the 10,825 valid votes cast and became the party's new leader that same day.

Notes

References 

Living people
1965 births
21st-century Japanese politicians
Members of the House of Representatives (Japan)
Japan Restoration Party politicians
Japan Innovation Party politicians
Liberal Democratic Party (Japan) politicians
Nippon Ishin no Kai politicians
People from Sakai, Osaka
Politicians from Osaka Prefecture